A Long Way Down (originally titled Up & Down) is a 2014 black comedy film directed by Pascal Chaumeil, loosely based on author Nick Hornby's 2005 novel, A Long Way Down. It stars Pierce Brosnan, Toni Collette, Imogen Poots, and Aaron Paul as four strangers who meet on the roof of a London building on New Year's Eve, each with the intent of dying by suicide. Their plans for death in solitude are ruined when they meet as they decide to come down from the roof alive, however temporary that may be. The film received mostly negative reviews, with criticism of the source material and the film's cast.

Plot
Martin Sharp (Pierce Brosnan) is contemplating suicide on New Year's Eve on the roof of the Toppers Building, high above London's streets. He is interrupted by a woman, Maureen (Toni Collette), who has the same fate in mind. She shyly offers to wait her turn, until two other strangers, a young woman named Jess (Imogen Poots) and a pizza deliverer called J.J. (Aaron Paul), also turn up.

Martin is recognised by the others, having been a popular television personality before going to prison for a relationship with a girl who turned out to be 15. After talking things over, the four strangers form a pact, vowing to wait at least until Valentine's Day before again attempting suicide.

Maureen has a disabled son she adores, but little life beyond that. Jess is the daughter of a politician (Sam Neill) and their relationship is strained. J.J. is an American who once played in a band, but while his three new acquaintances are suicidally depressed, he claims that he is terminally ill with cancer.

To profit from misfortune, Martin hatches a scheme that makes them the talk of London, claiming their mass suicide was interrupted by a vision. They end up on his old TV chat show, where Martin's former co-host Penny (Rosamund Pike) makes her guests feel humiliated and even more depressed.

The four go on vacation to get away from London's attention. They enjoy each other's company, until it is revealed that J.J.'s claim about cancer was a lie and the intervention of a journalist named Kathy (Tuppence Middleton) drives them apart. After the vacation, the four resume their lives. When Maureen's son Matty suffers a heart attack, Jess and Martin visit Maureen in the hospital but J.J. cannot be contacted. They realise it is Valentine's Day and that their pact has ended. All four end up back in London on the very same rooftop with the other three coaxing J.J. off the edge successfully.

On New Year's Eve that year, they video call each other. Martin is looking after his daughter, Maureen is enjoying herself at a New Year's party, and J.J. and Jess are in a happy relationship.

Cast
 Pierce Brosnan as Martin Sharp 
 Toni Collette as Maureen Thompson
 Imogen Poots as Jess Crichton 
 Aaron Paul as J.J. Maguire
 Rosamund Pike as Penny
 Sam Neill as Minister Crichton
 Tuppence Middleton as Kathy Miller
 Joe Cole as Chas Johnson
 Josef Altin as Maureen's son Matty

Production
Brosnan has stated that TV presenter Richard Madeley was an inspiration to him in playing the role. While reading the script for the film in the Colombe D'Or restaurant in Saint-Paul-de-Vence, Brosnan stated that he saw Madeley and his wife Judy Finnigan and later said, "I think it's his sheer ebullience and enthusiasm. You have to be almost shamanic to do it, really, and really believe in yourself. And it's a thin line between being affable and being really annoying. So it takes a brave soul, really."

Release
The film premiered at the 64th Berlin International Film Festival on 10 February 2014.

Reception
A Long Way Down received negative reviews from critics. Review aggregation website Rotten Tomatoes reported an approval rating of 22%, based on 50 reviews, with an average score of 4.2/10. The site's consensus reads, "Tonally jumbled and conceptually ill-advised, A Long Way Down bungles its source material and wastes a talented cast." At Metacritic, which assigns a rating out of 100 to reviews from mainstream critics, the film received an average score of 34, based on 21 reviews, indicating "generally unfavorable reviews".

In 2015, the film won a Voice Award from the American Substance Abuse and Mental Health Services Administration.

References

External links
 
 

2014 films
2014 comedy-drama films
British black comedy films
British comedy-drama films
Films scored by Dario Marianelli
Films about suicide
Films about television people
Films based on British novels
Films based on works by Nick Hornby
Films directed by Pascal Chaumeil
Films set in London
Films with screenplays by Jack Thorne
Lionsgate films
Films set around New Year
2014 black comedy films
Films about depression
2010s English-language films
2010s British films